The Uganda Program on Cancer and Infectious Diseases (UPCID), established in 2004, is a joint program between Fred Hutchinson Cancer Research Center in Seattle and the Uganda Cancer Institute. The program works to understand and treat infection-related cancers in the United States and abroad.

The UPCID Clinic and Training Center is located at Makerere University Medical School on the campus of Mulago Hospital in Kampala, Uganda.

Leadership collaboration
The collaboration was founded by Corey Casper, a physician-scientist at the Fred Hutchinson Cancer Center and Jackson Orem, director of the Uganda Cancer Institute.

Funding
In October 2009, the United States Agency for International Development awarded a US$500,000 grant to the Fred Hutchinson Cancer Center to aid in the construction of the first United States cancer clinic and medical-training facility in Africa.

References

External links 
 Official website
 Photo Gallery of UPCID

Cancer research
Hospitals in Kampala